Peter Marlow (born 20 April 1941) is a British racewalker who competed at the 1972 Olympic Games in Munich, finishing 17th in the 20 km walk. He was born in London.

He has been chief judge for racewalking at the Olympic Games in 2008, 2004 and 2000 and at other major international championships. He was elected president of the Race Walking Association in 2003. He was also a former editor of the magazine Race Walking Record for three years.

Peter is currently a member of the IAAF Race Walking Committee, having represented race walkers at IAAF since 2001

Personal bests

References

1941 births
Living people
Athletes from London
British male racewalkers
English male racewalkers
British magazine editors
Olympic athletes of Great Britain
Athletes (track and field) at the 1972 Summer Olympics